Ali Hossain (1940-2021) was a Bangladeshi music director. He has composed music for 46 films. The following is a list of films he scored:

1960s

1970s

1980s

1990s

2000s

2010s

2020s

Year unknown

Background score only

Non-film albums

As lyricist

References

Sources
 

Discographies of Bangladeshi artists
Discographies of Pakistani artists